The 1992 Virginia Slims of Chicago was a women's tennis tournament played on indoor carpet courts at the UIC Pavilion in Chicago, Illinois in the United States and was part of the Tier II  category of the 1992 WTA Tour. It was the 21st edition of the tournament and was held from February 10 through February 16, 1992. Second-seeded Martina Navratilova won the singles title, her 3rd consecutive at the event and 12th in total, earned $70,000 first-prize money as well as 300 ranking points.

Finals

Singles
 Martina Navratilova defeated  Jana Novotná 7–6(7–4), 4–6, 7–5
 It was Navratilova's 1st singles title of the year and the 158th of her career.

Doubles
 Martina Navratilova /  Pam Shriver defeated  Katrina Adams /  Zina Garrison-Jackson 6–2, 6–4

References

External links
 ITF tournament edition details
 Tournament draws

Virginia Slims of Chicago
Ameritech Cup
Virginia Slims of Chicago
Virginia Slims of Chicago
Virginia Slims of Chicago